Gloryland is the debut studio album by the Contemporary Christian and gospel singer Raymond Cilliers.

Track listing 
 "Glory Land"
 "Mourning into Dancing"
 "I Call Him Lord"
 "Jericho"
 "Mensekind"
 "Prayer Is the Key to Heaven"
 "Jesus Will Hold Me"
 "Just a Little"
 "Straatpredikant"
 "Always be a Child"
 "Verbly jou in die Here"
 "Standing by"

Certifications 

|-
! scope="row"  | South Africa (RISA)
| Gold
| 20,000^
|}

References

1994 albums
Raymond Cilliers albums